Roseivivax halotolerans is a species of bacteria. It is aerobic and bacteriochlorophyll-containing, first isolated from the epiphytes on the stromatolites of a saline lake located on the west coast of Australia. It is chemoheterotrophic, Gram-negative, motile, rod-shaped and with subpolar flagella. Its type strain is OCh 210T (= JCM 10271T).

References

Further reading

External links

LPSN
Type strain of Roseivivax halotolerans at BacDive -  the Bacterial Diversity Metadatabase

Rhodobacteraceae
Bacteria described in 1999